Park Records is an independent British record label based in Oxford that specializes in British folk music, traditional music, and acoustic music.

The company began in 1989, with singles and albums by Maddy Prior but has grown to include many established acts including Steeleye Span, Lindisfarne, Jacqui McShee, and Kathryn Tickell, and newer talent such as Katie Doherty, Giles Lewin, and Moonshee. Park celebrated their 23-year anniversary with the release of  the compilation album Park Life.

See also
 List of record labels
 List of independent UK record labels

External links
 Website

Record labels established in 1990
British independent record labels
Folk record labels
Rock record labels